Prai may refer to:
 Prai people, an ethnic group in Thailand and Laos
 Prai language, a Mon–Khmer language of Thailand and Laos
Perai, a city in Malaysia
Perai River, in Malaysia
Prai River Bridge
Phosphoribosylanthranilate isomerase, an enzyme
Jacob Prai (active 1971), Chairman of the Senate of the Republic of West Papua

See also 
Prais (disambiguation)

Language and nationality disambiguation pages